Isaiah Simmons (born July 26, 1998) is an American football inside linebacker for the Arizona Cardinals of the National Football League (NFL). He played college football at Clemson and was drafted by the Cardinals eighth overall in the 2020 NFL Draft. While at Clemson, Simmons was noted for his positional versatility as he played linebacker, defensive end, cornerback, and safety.

Early years
Isaiah Simmons was born in Omaha, Nebraska on July 26, 1998. He later attended Olathe North High School in Olathe, Kansas, playing defensive back and wide receiver. He committed to Clemson University in February 2016.

College career
Simmons redshirted his first year at Clemson in 2016. As a safety in 2017, he played in 14 games, recording 49 tackles and one sack. In 2018, he converted to linebacker. In 15 games, Simmons had 97 tackles, 1.5 sacks and one interception. He returned to Clemson in 2019 rather than enter the 2019 NFL Draft. Simmons received the Butkus Award as the nation's best linebacker for his performance that year. After graduating in December 2019 with a degree in sports communication, Simmons announced that he would forgo his senior year by declaring for the 2020 NFL Draft. During his time at Clemson, Simmons was noted for his positional versatility, taking snaps at linebacker, defensive end, cornerback, and safety.

Statistics

Professional career

Simmons participated in the 2020 NFL Combine, leading all linebackers with a 4.39-second 40-yard dash. He was one of 58 players invited to the 2020 NFL Draft, which was held virtually due to social distancing regulations arising from the COVID-19 pandemic, where he was drafted by the Arizona Cardinals with the eighth overall pick.

Despite playing only five snaps in Week 7 against the Seattle Seahawks on Sunday Night Football, Simmons recorded his first career interception off Russell Wilson with a minute left in overtime, helping the Cardinals win 37–34.

Simmons entered the 2021 season as a starting inside linebacker. He started all 17 games, finishing third on the team with 105 tackles, 1.5 sacks, four forced fumbles, and seven passes defensed.

In Week 7 against the New Orleans Saints, Simmons had five tackles, and a pick-six in the second quarter in the 42–34 win.

Statistics

References

External links

Arizona Cardinals bio
Clemson Tigers bio

1998 births
Living people
Sportspeople from Olathe, Kansas
Players of American football from Kansas
African-American players of American football
American football linebackers
American football safeties
Clemson Tigers football players
All-American college football players
Sportspeople from Omaha, Nebraska
Players of American football from Nebraska
Arizona Cardinals players
American football cornerbacks
American football defensive ends
21st-century African-American sportspeople